Richard Locksley is a medical doctor, professor and researcher of infectious diseases, who pioneered approaches to study immunology. He is a professor of medicine and microbiology and immunology at the University of California, San Francisco School of Medicine, where he also serves as the director of the Sandler Asthma Basic Research Center. He is also an investigator for the Howard Hughes Medical Institute. He is a fellow of the American Academy of Microbiology. In 2018, he was inducted into the National Academy of Sciences for his work on immunology.

Early life
Locksley graduated from Kent School in 1966. He received a Bachelor of Arts in biochemistry from Harvard College in 1970 and Doctor of Medicine from the University of Rochester in 1976. He completed his residency at University of California, San Francisco School of Medicine in 1980 and trained in infectious diseases at the University of Washington 1980-1983.

References

Year of birth missing (living people)
Living people
American infectious disease physicians
Harvard University alumni
Howard Hughes Medical Investigators
Kent School alumni
Members of the United States National Academy of Sciences
University of California, San Francisco alumni
UCSF School of Medicine faculty
University of Rochester alumni
University of Washington alumni